Burt Lake State Park is a public recreation area covering  on the south shore of Burt Lake at Indian River in Cheboygan County, Michigan.  The state park features over 2000 feet of sandy shoreline, swimming, boating access to the Inland Lakes Waterway, fishing on the Sturgeon River and Burt Lake, and camping facilities.

History
The park site was first purchased in 1920, with additional parcels acquired through 1939. It was among 13 parks established in 1920 following the creation of the Michigan State Parks Commission a year earlier.

References

External links
Burt Lake State Park Michigan Department of Natural Resources 
Burt Lake State Park Map Michigan Department of Natural Resources

State parks of Michigan
Protected areas of Cheboygan County, Michigan
Protected areas established in 1920
1920 establishments in Michigan
IUCN Category III